is a former Japanese football player.

Playing career
Hanayama was born in Tochigi Prefecture on August 21, 1977. After graduating from high school, he joined J1 League club Urawa Reds in 1996. Although he was defensive midfielder, he could not play at all in the match until 1997. In 1998, he moved to Gamba Osaka. On April 25, he debuted against Kyoto Purple Sanga. However he could only play this match. In 1999, he moved to newly was promoted to J2 League club, Vegalta Sendai. He was converted to center back by manager Takekazu Suzuki and became a regular player as right or left back of three backs defense. However the club results were bad and lost 10 games in a row. Manager Suzuki resigned in July and Hidehiko Shimizu became a new manager in August. Shimizu changed to four backs system and Hanayama could not play at all in the match. He left the club end of 1999 season. In 2003, he joined his local club Tochigi SC in Japan Football League. Although he played in matches in 2003, he could not play at all in the match from 2004 and retired end of 2005 season.

Club statistics

References

External links

1977 births
Living people
Japanese footballers
Association football people from Tochigi Prefecture
J1 League players
J2 League players
Japan Football League players
Urawa Red Diamonds players
Gamba Osaka players
Vegalta Sendai players
Tochigi SC players
Association football defenders